The discography of British singer, composer, songwriter, producer and author Dev Hynes consists of work with groups like Test Icicles and solo work produced under the aliases Lightspeed Champion and Blood Orange. This list is also comprehensive of productions credited to his given name, Devonté Hynes.

Test Icicles (with Rory Attwell, Sam Mehran)

Studio albums

Extended Play

Lightspeed Champion

Studio albums

Extended plays

Singles

Promotional singles

Mixtapes

Blood Orange

Studio albums

Extended Play

Singles

Promotional singles

Mixtapes

VeilHymn (with Bryndon Cook)

Single

Devonté Hynes

Film and television scores

Extended Plays

Classical Works

Production, features, and writing discography

References

Discographies of British artists
Pop music discographies
Rhythm and blues discographies